Issam B S Freiha (born September 22, 1985), known professionally as icekream, is a Dubai & Miami-based music producer.

Early life 

Growing up in Paris, France to American & Lebanese/Emirati parents - from an early age, icekream was exposed to a very active - local & international - Hip-Hop & House scene. The electronic revolution led by acts such as Daft Punk & Modjo, was approaching fever-pitch levels during the peak of his youth. He was greatly inspired by a vast array of acts, from Jamiroquai, Fatboy Slim, DJ Premier, Dr. Dre, The Neptunes, Michael Jackson and IAM.

Music career 

In early 2011, icekream founded the record label ‘E11 Entertainment’ and subsequently signed his first artist ‘Lyrican’. 2012 and onwards saw his rise via the Soundcloud platform at a time when Trap/EDM music had become increasingly popular. icekream began sharing his music & DJ’ing in clubs & venues around London, Paris, the US & UAE. In 2013 icekream met artist Wyclef in Abu Dhabi & proceeded to produce his song ‘Trap N Roll’ feat. Waka Flocka.

2017 saw the release of his first major single ‘Hear Dat’ alongside TroyBoi via Parlophone Records/Warner Music Group. In mid-2018, he was noticed by a two-time Grammy Award-winning duo Cool & Dre, with who he signed a placement deal with. Shortly afterwards, icekream unveiled his brand-new EP, a 5-track delivery titled ‘Night Feel’, made in collaboration with Saudi rapper Jeed.

In 2019, icekream founded Kream Kingdom, a boutique record label based in Miami, FL. His first placement came in 2020 for artist Eric Leon’s  ‘Lemme See’. Early 2021, icekream released his singles ‘Real Rap’, ‘LID’ & ‘Romantico’. He primarily featured NY-based Hip Hop artist Prayah.

Early 2021, icekream released his singles 'What it Be' and 'Runners Pace'; the first of his collaborations with 20-year-old Egyptian born, DC based Mo Sella. In 2022, icekream released single Ablaze. In 2022 Kream Kingdom signed a new artist: the Cuban-born & Miami-living El Larra. His EP ‘Mi Oportunidad’ was released on September 2.

References

External links
 

Living people
Record producers
Musicians from Dubai
1985 births